Lake Daniell is a lake in the West Coast Region of the South Island of New Zealand. Until 2008 the lake was officially named as Lake Daniells.

It is drained by Frazer Stream which in turn feeds into the Alfred River and is surrounded by old growth beech forest. A tramping track leads to the lake and an adjacent hut, the Manson-Nicholls Memorial Hut.

In 2002 there was a search in the area for a missing tramper who was part of a group staying at the lake. The tramper, a 14-year-old male, was found dead next to the Alfred River.

See also
List of lakes in New Zealand

References

External links
Department of Conservation - access information for Lake Daniell

Daniell